The endangered San Joaquin kit fox (Vulpes macrotis mutica) was formerly very common in the San Joaquin Valley and through much of Central California. Its 1990 population was estimated to be 7,000. This subspecies is still endangered, after nearly 50 years of being on the Endangered Species List. Officially this subspecies was listed March 3, 1967.  On September 26, 2007, Wildlands Inc. announced the designation of the  Deadman Creek Conservation Bank, which is intended specifically to protect habitat of the San Joaquin kit fox. However, the population continues to decline mostly due to heavy habitat loss. Other factors include competition from red fox, and the extermination of the gray wolf from California has left the coyote as the dominant meso-predator in kit fox territory bringing an imbalance in ecosystem relationships. Sarcoptic mange has also constituted a significant threat, specifically to the Bakersfield population of the subspecies, with 15 confirmed cases reported by the end of 2014.

Gallery

References

Fox
Natural history of the Central Valley (California)
San Joaquin Valley
ESA endangered species